A voicemail system (also known as voice message or voice bank) is a computer-based system that allows users and subscribers to exchange personal voice messages; to select and deliver voice information; and to process transactions relating to individuals, organizations, products, and services, using an ordinary phone. The term is also used more broadly to denote any system of conveying a stored telecommunications voice messages, including using an answering machine. Most cell phone services offer voicemail as a basic feature; many corporate private branch exchanges include versatile internal voice-messaging services, and *98 vertical service code subscription is available to most individual and small business landline subscribers (in the US).

History
The term Voicemail was coined by Televoice International (later Voicemail International, or VMI) for their introduction of the first US-wide Voicemail service in 1980. Although VMI trademarked the term, it eventually became a generic term for automated voice services employing a telephone. Voicemail popularity continues today with Internet telephone services such as Skype, Google Voice and ATT that integrate voice, voicemail and text services for tablets and smartphones.

Voicemail systems were developed in the late 1970s by Voice Message Exchange (VMX). They became popular in the early 1980s when they were made available on PC-based boards. In September 2012 a report from USA Today and Vonage claimed that voicemail was in decline. The report said that the number of voicemail messages declined eight percent compared to 2011.

Features

Voicemail systems are designed to convey a caller's recorded audio message to a recipient. To do so they contain a user interface to select, play, and manage messages; a delivery method to either play or otherwise deliver the message; and a notification ability to inform the user of a waiting message. Most systems use phone networks, either cellular- or landline-based, as the conduit for all of these functions. Some systems may use multiple telecommunications methods, permitting recipients and callers to retrieve or leave messages through multiple methods such as PCs, PDA, cell phones, or smartphones.

Simple voicemail systems function as a remote answering machine using touch-tones as the user interface. More complicated systems may use other input devices such as voice or a computer interface. Simpler voicemail systems may play the audio message through the phone, while more advanced systems may have alternative delivery methods, including email or text message delivery, message transfer and forwarding options, and multiple mailboxes.

Almost all modern voicemail systems use digital storage and are typically stored on computer data storage. Notification methods also vary based on the voicemail system. Simple systems may not provide active notification at all, instead requiring the recipient to check with the system, while others may provide an indication that messages are waiting.

More advanced systems may be integrated with a company's PABX, with a call center ACD for automatic call distribution; with mobile or paging terminals for message alert; and computer systems/data bases for delivering information or processing orders. Interactive voice response (IVR) systems may use digital information stored in a corporate data base to select pre-recorded words and phrases stored in a voicemail vocabulary to form sentences that are delivered to the caller.

Message centers 
The conventional solution to efficient handling of telephone communication in businesses was the "message center". A message center or "message desk" was a centralized, manual answering service inside a company staffed by a few operators who answered all incoming phone calls. Extensions that were busy or rang "no answer" would forward to the message center using a device called a "call director". The call director had a button for each extension in the company which would flash when that person's extension forwarded to the message center. A little label next to the button told the operator the person being called.

While it was an improvement over basic multi-line systems, the message center had many disadvantages. Many calls would come in simultaneously at peak periods, such as lunch time, and operators were often busy. This left message attendants with little time to take each message accurately. Often, they were not familiar with employees' names and "buzzwords" and how to spell or pronounce them. Messages were scribbled on pink slips and distributed by the internal mail system and messages, often arrived at people's desks after lengthy delays, contained little content other than the caller's name and number, and were often inaccurate, with misspelled names and wrong phone numbers.

Tape-based telephone answering machines had come into the residential telephone market, but they weren't used much in the corporate environment due to physical limitations of the technology. One answering machine was needed for each telephone; messages couldn't be recorded if the user was using the phone; messages had to be retrieved in sequential order; and messages couldn't be retrieved remotely, selectively discarded, saved, or forwarded to others. Further, the manufacturers of PBXs (private branch exchanges—the name for corporate phone systems) used proprietary digital phone sets in order to increase the functionality and value of the PBX. These phone sets were, by design, incompatible with answering machines.

In the 1970s and early 1980s, the cost of long-distance calling decreased and more business communications were conducted by telephone. As corporations grew and labor rates increased, the ratio of secretaries to employees decreased. With more communication by phone, multiple time zones, and fewer secretaries, real-time phone communications were hampered by callers being unable to reach people. Some early studies showed that only 1 in 4 phone calls resulted in a completed call and half the calls were one-way in nature (that is, they did not require a conversation). This happened because people were either not at work (due to time zone differences, being away on business, etc.), or if they were at work, they were on the phone, away from their desks in meetings, on breaks, etc. This bottleneck hindered the effectiveness of business activities and decreased both individual and group productivity. It also wasted the caller's time and created delays in resolving time-critical issues.

Invention
The first public records describing voice recording were reported in a New York newspaper and the Scientific American in November 1877. Thomas A. Edison had announced the invention of his "phonograph" saying "the object was to record telephone messages and transmit them again by telephone." Edison applied for a US patent in December 1877 and shortly thereafter demonstrated the machine to publishers, the US Congress and President Rutherford B. Hayes, recording and playing "Mary had a little lamb..." and "there was a little girl who had a little curl... " and other ditties popular at the time. In an article outlining his own ideas of the future usefulness of his machine Edison's list began with "Letter writing, and all kinds of dictation without the aid of a stenographer." In other words, "voice messages" or "Voice-mail". By 1914, Edison's phonograph business included a dictating machine (the Ediphone) and the "Telescribe", a machine combining the phonograph and the telephone, which recorded both sides of telephone conversations.

For nearly one hundred years, there were few innovations or advances in telephone services. Voicemail was the result of innovations in telephone products and services made possible by developments in computer technology during the 1970s. These innovations began with the Motorola Pageboy, a simple "pager" or "beeper" introduced in 1974 that was generally offered in conjunction with answering services that handled busy / no-answer overloads and after hours calls for businesses and professionals. Operators wrote down a caller's message, sent a page alert or "beep" and when the party called back, an operator dictated the message.

With the introduction of "voice" pagers, like the Motorola Pageboy II operators could transmit a voice message directly to the pager and the user could hear the message. However, messages arrival was often untimely and privacy issues, as well as the high cost, eventually caused the demise of these services. By the mid 1970s digital storage and analog to digital conversion devices had emerged and paging companies began handling client messages electronically. Operators recorded a short message (five to six seconds, e.g. "please call Mr. Smith") and the messages were delivered automatically when the client called the answering service. It would only take a short step for the first voicemail application to be born.

Computer manufacturers, telephone equipment manufacturers, and software firms began developing more sophisticated solutions as more powerful and less expensive computer processors and storage devices became available. This set the stage for a creation of a broad spectrum of computer based Central Office and Customer Premises Equipment that would eventually support enhanced voice solutions such as voicemail, audiotex, interactive voice response (IVR) and speech recognition solutions that began emerging in the 1980s. However, broad adoption of these products and services would depend on the global proliferation of touch tone phones and mobile phone services which would not occur until the late 1980s.

Controversy
Many contributed to the creation of the modern-day voicemail. Legal battles ensued for decades.
The  of voicemail, patent number 4,124,773 (Audio Storage and Distribution System), is Robin Elkins.
"Though Elkins received a patent in 1978, telecommunications giants began offering voicemail without paying Elkins a penny in royalties."
"Elkins never expected to spend 10 years of his life battling some of the world's largest corporations, either. But once he patented his system, he figured he should protect it."
Later, Elkins successfully licensed his patented technology to IBM, DEC, and WANG, among many others. Unfortunately, his patent did not address simultaneity of voice message access and storage and the application for patent was filed after the patent application of the system patented by Kolodny and Hughes, as described below.

Pioneering applications

One of the first modern day voicemail applications was invented by Gerald M. Kolodny and Paul Hughes, which was described in an article in the medical journal, Radiology (Kolodny GM, Cohen HI, Kalisky A. Rapid-access system for radiology reports: a new concept. Radiology. 1974;111(3):717–9) A patent was applied for by Kolodny and Hughes in 1975, prior to the patent applications of both Elkins and Matthews and was issued in 1981 (US patent 4,260,854). The patent was assigned to Sudbury Systems of Sudbury Massachusetts who proceeded to market and sell such systems to corporations and hospitals. IBM, Sony and Lanier, as well as several smaller makers of voicemail systems, licensed the Sudbury patent for their voicemail systems. A patent suit, brought by Pitney Bowes, claiming prior art to the Sudbury patent, was denied by the US District Court, District of Connecticut on November 8, 2000. A similar suit brought byVDI Technologies against the Kolodny and Hughes patent claiming prior art was dismissed by the US District Court in New Hampshire on December 19, 1991.

IBM Audio Distribution System 

The  voice-messaging application, the Speech Filing System, was developed at the IBM Thomas J. Watson Research Center in 1973 under the leadership of Stephen Boies. It was later renamed the Audio Distribution System (ADS).

ADS used the human voice and the fixed-line touch-tone telephones that predated computer screens and mobile phones. The first operational prototypes were used by 750 IBM executives mainly in the US for their daily work. Those prototypes ran on an IBM System/7 computer attached to an IBM VM370 for additional storage.

In 1978 the prototype was converted to run on an IBM Series/1 computer. In September 1981 IBM started marketing ADS in America and Europe: the first customer installation was completed in February 1982.

ADS, marketed by IBM and briefly by AT&T Corporation, was well featured for voice messaging, the result of IBM's considerable human-factors research plus observation of operational use. Using a 1980s computer requiring air conditioning, it was expensive and physically large. With further development it grew to handle up to 3000 users, 100 hours of messages, multiple languages, message notification to a host computer, and 16 simultaneous users.

ADS could be connected to exchange lines and private exchanges including the IBM 2750 and 3750 Switching Systems available in Germany, France, Italy, Belgium, and the UK.

IBM sold many systems, Installations including:

 The 1984 Los Angeles Olympic Games "Olympic Message System" with seven systems serving 7,800 athletes and 6,000 staff, trainers, coaches and officials — and voice prompts in the 12 Olympic official languages (English, French, Spanish, German, Portuguese, Arabic, Japanese, Mandarin, Norwegian, and Italian) for 55,000 messages, totalling over 100,000 message minutes 
 General Motors, USA with 8 ADS systems saving 30 percent of the costs of its long-distance calls
 Systems across America and Europe for insurance-company staff to report their appraisals of damaged vehicles and hear the locations of their next appraisal sites
 Esso in France and Mars in England for salesforce coordination
 Rowntree's in York, England to liaise with the chocolate-makers' agents across time zones in Europe, North America, the Middle East, and Australia
 Italy from early 1985: 10 systems across Italy for the public to call to hear locally-relevant autostrade traffic-delay information
 Milan, Italy: two systems for automated airport announcements, handling multiple languages.

Delta 1 

Another company, Delphi Communications of California, deserves some partial credit for invention of voicemail. Under the leadership of Jay Stoffer, Delphi developed a proprietary system called Delta 1 that picked up incoming calls directly from the telephone company. Stoffer presented the Delphi concept publicly to the association of Telephone Answering Services around 1973 and the prototype system was launched in San Francisco in 1976 by a Delphi company called VoiceBank. Delphi developed Delta 1 as a purely service-oriented voice messaging system to answer subscriber telephones for businesses and professionals. Delta 1 required human intervention for message deposit. While three machines were built, only one machine was put into operational service. The completely automated voice messaging system (Delta 2) was developed for initial operational use in Los Angeles in 1981. Apparently Delta 2 was built, installed and operational for a short while, but unfortunately Delphi's major early investor, Exxon Enterprises, abruptly shut down Delphi in July 1982. Nothing further was done with Delphi's technology. A patent was applied for and issued for Delphi's Automated Telephone Voice Service System. The patent, US Patent No. 4,625,081, was issued after Delphi's closure, but Delphi's assets (and the patent) were transferred to another Exxon company, Gilbarco, which made equipment for gas pumps at filling stations. Gilbarco is now owned by GEC in the United Kingdom.

AT&T 
AT&T developed a system called 1A Voice Storage System to support custom services including voicemail
for the public telephone system. It worked in conjunction with the companies 1A ESS and 5ESS systems. Development started in mid-1976, with first deployment in early 1979. Friendly user service started in March 1980. The service was terminated in 1981 as a result of the US FCC Computer Inquiry II, which prohibited enhanced services from being provided by the regulated network.

VMX 

In 1979, a company was founded in Texas by Gordon Matthews called ECS Communications (the name was later changed to VMX, for Voice Message exchange). VMX developed a 3000-user voice messaging system called the VMX/64 and was  company to offer a voice messaging system for sale commercially for corporate use. In the early 1980s, VMX sold voice messaging systems to several large corporations, such as 3M, Kodak, American Express, Intel, Hoffmann–La Roche, Corning Glass, Arco, Shell Canada and Westinghouse. The impressive list of early adopters started the ball rolling on corporate voicemail. While VMX began with a good start, it failed at developing the market, and the company was not a commercial success. It took several years before its products could answer outside calls (and then only under certain circumstances), they were physically enormous, expensive, light on important user features and had serious reliability issues. In addition, the user interface was cumbersome, requiring the users to remember non-intuitive multi-digit Touch-tone commands. Matthews, a prolific entrepreneur and patentor, applied for and was granted a patent on voicemail (patent number 4,371,752) which issued in February 1983. The patent was promoted as the pioneering patent for voicemail. However, the patent application was filed on November 26, 1979, five years after, and issued in 1983, two years after that of Kolodny and Hughes as described above, and cannot, therefore, be considered as the pioneering foundation of voicemail.

VMX asserted infringement first with IBM, AT&T and then Wang, but all three companies reportedly would have been able to invalidate the patent on the basis of prior art and their licenses from Sudbury Systems Inc, for their Kolodny and Hughes patent (see above). VMX cleverly achieved a settlement where the patent was let stand, not challenged in court and IBM, Wang and AT&T (in separate settlements) received royalty-free licenses to all VMX patents. Wang, the last of the majors to get such a license for itself and Voice-mail International, essentially paid $20,000 and cross-licensed a few patent applications (not issued patents). IBM and AT&T also cross-licensed a number of patents to VMX, most of which were obsolete or outdated. VMX could claim that several major companies licensed the patent (even though they paid almost nothing to VMX for the rights), but that part wasn't disclosed. The patent was never challenged in court and VMX then continued to assert (incorrectly) that it had invented voicemail and that Matthews was the "father of voice-mail". Following the settlement with Wang, VMX settled with Octel Communications in exchange for a small payment and Octel's agreeing not to litigate any VMX patent, Octel received a paid-up, royalty-free license on all existing and future VMX patents.

IVR Voice Recognition 
In 1985, Voice Response Inc. (formerly Call-It Co) a subsidiary of Lee Enterprises, Davenport IA, entered the fast-growing Interactive Voice (IVR) response market under the direction of Bob Ross, President. About a year later, VRI introduced one of the first "successful" IVR applications that utilized voice recognition (rather than touch tone) to capture caller responses. Voice recognition technology had great difficulty with regional and ethnic differences and nuances which resulted in a high incidence of error. VRI discovered that hesitation (delayed response) signaled caller confusion or misunderstanding which often resulted in an inaccurate response. VRI developed proprietary techniques that measured user response times and used the data to make real-time changes to the application's dialog with the caller. VRI found that the confidence level of a "suspect" caller response could be increased by asking "Did you say (Chicago), Yes or No", a standard question heard in order taking or reservation making IVR applications today. VRI pioneering applications, including subscription fulfillment for Time and Life magazines, proved faster and less expensive than call centers using live operators and although VRI did not survive, their voice recognition processes became industry standards and VRI's patent USPTO - patent RE34,587 was eventually licensed by Intel/Dialogic and Nuance.

PC-based Voicemail 
Amidst the booming popularity of the IBM PC-AT, a variety of companies popped up to market add-in boards to the AT. These companies aimed to use the PC as an inexpensive hardware platform for hosting add-in boards and software providing voice mail functionality for small businesses that wanted something more sophisticated than an answering machine but couldn't afford pricey conventional voice mail solutions. Among the most successful of these was The Complete PC, founded in 1986 in Silicon Valley. At its peak, The Complete PC was selling over 20,000 voicemail boards per year, some including facsimile capabilities as well for small businesses. The Complete PC was sold to publicly-listed Florida-based Boca Research Inc. in 1993. An early pointer was BIG Mouth, a single line simplified voicemail solution, invented by TT Technology and Charles Wohl, later joined the Swedish tech team under ESSELTE VOICE and produced 2 and 4 line analog cards, to be mounted on standard industry PC Boards.

International Voicemail Association
In 1987, voicemail service providers in the US and Europe joined to form the Voice Mail Association of Europe (VMA) with René Beusch, Radio-Suisse and Paul Finnigan, Finnigan USA serving as VMA Chairman and President respectively. The first VMA meeting was held in Stockholm Huddinge by Voicemail Svenska AB in 1987, organized by its founder Lars Olof Kanngard. The tech team in Voicemail Svenska AB was granted the right to port the Voicemail from PDP systems to their own PC-board solution, which become known as the MiniVoice, later become ESSELTE VOICE AB. The VMA invited service providers, vendors and consultants to attend semi-annual conferences that included presentations, discussions and reporting of experiences. VMA membership was eventually expanded to include representatives from telecommunication organizations worldwide and became "The International Voice-mail Association". By the late 1980s, the Bell Operating companies, Tigon and other independent service providers in the US had joined the VMA. In 1992, VMA members conducted an "Information Week Tour of the U.S.", sharing ideas with major telecom operators. VMA working groups promoted collaboration and adoption of industry standards to the ITU and CCITT and at the 1999 CCITT conference in Geneva, Switzerland, demonstrated worldwide exchange of messages between the major voicemail vendors' platforms using the VPIM networking standard. Beusch and Finnigan led the VMA until 1998 and 1999 respectively and the organization continues to serve the voice services industry today.

Corporate voicemail

In the early 1980s, there were over 30 companies vying for the corporate voicemail market. Among the many contenders were IBM, VMX, Wang, Octel, ROLM, AT&T, Northern Telecom, Delphi Communications, Voice and Data Systems, Opcom, Commterm, Comsys, Genesis, Brook Trout, Livecom, Innovative Technology (ITI), Glenayre, BBL, AVT, AVST, Digital Sound, Centigram, Voice-mail International and Active Voice. Only a few of these companies were successful in capturing a significant market share and remain in the voicemail business today.

ROLM Corporation, founded in 1969 by Gene Richeson, Ken Oshman, Walter Loewenstern and Robert Maxfield, was the first PBX manufacturer to offer integrated voicemail with its PhoneMail system, its registered trademark. PhoneMail offered impressive recording quality of its digitized messages. ROLM's digital PBX (called a CBX, for Computerized Branch eXchange) was the first to enable PhoneMail to illuminate a message waiting light on ROLM phones equipped with message waiting lights (also a stutter dialtone is used with analog and digital phones). Rolm was sold to IBM, who later sold it to Siemens who offer PhoneMail in various configurations/sizes (including a micro-sized version) and its unified messaging successor, Xpressions 470. ROLM was purchased by IBM in the mid-1980s (which was a financial disaster for the profitable ROLM, as IBM clearly could not grasp the laid back, "think outside the box" attitude of ROLM, which was the #2 PBX supplier in the US from the mid-'70s to late '80s), then sold half interest to the German company Siemens. In 1992, Siemens bought ROLM entirely from IBM and the original ROLM product line was done for, except for PhoneMail (the only product Siemens did not destroy). VMX suffered from poor product and ineffective management and was about to fold when Opcom merged with it. The surviving company was called VMX, but VMX was all but erased by Opcom except for its name and patent portfolio.

Opcom, a company founded by David Ladd, developed a voicemail system primarily marketed to smaller enterprises. Opcom pioneered and patented the feature of automated attendant (US Patent numbers 4,747,124 and 4,783,796 both issued in 1988), an integral part of any voicemail systems. The automated attendant enables callers to direct calls by pressing single digit keys, e.g. "If you are making domestic reservations, press '1'; for international reservations, press '2'; etc." Opcom later pioneered the concept of Unified Messaging (to be discussed later in this article). Opcom eventually acquired VMX through a reverse merger, (Opcom was private and VMX was public) and the surviving company VMX was eventually acquired by Octel.

Octel Communications, founded in 1982 by Bob Cohn and Peter Olson, broadly commercialized the corporate voice messaging market. While Octel benefited from the work and experiments of others it was the first stand-alone voicemail company to build a strong business and strategy to win in this difficult market. In addition, Octel innovated substantially new technology which contributed heavily to its success including a system architecture that was physically smaller, faster, more reliable, and much less costly than other corporate vendors. Octel's voicemail system, was introduced in 1984, included unique system features, many of which were patented, which gave Octel market leadership. In 1990 Octel was one of the first companies to introduce the concept of Unified Messaging.

AT&T/Lucent created its version of voicemail in the early 1990s (called Audix) but it would only work on AT&T/Lucent PBXs. Northern Telecom developed Meridian Mail and followed the same strategy as AT&T in that Meridian Mail only worked with Northern Telecom PBXs. As a result, neither company achieved much market share with large national or multi-national accounts. AT&T spun off its equipment business into a company called Lucent Technologies, and Northern Telecom changed its name to Nortel.

By the mid-1990s, Octel had become the number one supplier of voicemail both to corporations and to carriers. Octel had about a 60 percent market share in the US, Canada, Europe and Japan (for large corporations) and between 30 percent and 100 percent of the carrier market, depending on the country. By 1997 Octel's biggest competitors were Audix, made by Lucent, and Meridian Mail, made by Nortel. In July 1997, Octel was purchased by Lucent Technology. Lucent's AUDIX division was merged into Octel to form the Octel Messaging Division. By 2000, some estimate that there were over 150,000,000 active users of corporate and carrier voicemail made by the Octel Messaging Division. Shortly thereafter, Lucent spun off its corporate business, including the Octel Messaging Division, into a company known as Avaya.

Boston Technology, uReach Technologies, and Comverse Technology all entered the carrier market in the early 1990s. Boston was eventually acquired by Comverse, making it the second-largest supplier to carriers after Octel. However, in a few years, Comverse became the largest supplier to carriers with Lucent/Octel holding its leadership in the corporate market and second place with carriers. Primal Technologies entered the market in 2003 with Web-based Voicemail and VM-to-Email for corporate clients. For IP-based voicemail systems, Ericsson claims market leadership with its Ericsson Messaging-over-IP (MoIP) solution. Comverse changed its name to Xius in 2015. uReach provided VoiceMail services for Verizon and a host of other Tier 1 and Tier 2 carriers and was the voicemail system used by Verizon FIOS. uReach Technologies was acquired by GENBAND in 2014. In a move to reach more millennials, Primal Technologies NFV Unified Visual Voicemail recently added WhatsApp and Facebook integration for Voicemail deposit notifications.

Public telephone services

In the US, the Bell Operating Companies and their cellular divisions had been prohibited by the FCC from offering voicemail and other enhanced services such as paging and telephone answering services (no such prohibition existed in foreign countries). A ruling by Judge Harold H. Greene on March 7, 1988, removed this barrier and allowed the BOCs to offer voicemail service, however, they were not allowed to design or manufacture equipment used to provide voicemail services.

The opportunity created by the Greene decision, plus Voicemail International's abandonment of its market lead for carrier-grade systems, created a new opportunity for competing manufacturers and those who had been focusing on the corporate market. Unisys, Boston Technology, and Comverse Technology were quick to address the BOC and PTT marketplace. Octel, who had high capacity systems in use internally by all seven Regional Bell Operating companies, launched a new generation of its large system specifically designed for carriers and was compliant with "NEBS standards", the tight standard required by phone companies for any equipment located in their central offices.

While Unisys eventually secured PacBell's residential voicemail services, Boston Technology became the mainstay of Bell Atlantic's residential voicemail offering and Comverse Technology enjoyed some success in the European market; Octel became the provider of voicemail platforms for virtually all of the major US wireless carriers (including the seven RBOCs, AT&T Wireless and McCaw), Canadian cellular carriers and a large percentage of the GSM carriers around the world.

However, it didn't take long for Comverse to become the largest supplier to the BOCs and PTTs with Lucent/Octel holding its leadership in the corporate market and second place with carriers. Boston was eventually acquired by Comverse making it the second-largest supplier to carriers after Octel.

Unified messaging

Unified Messaging integrated voicemail into Microsoft Exchange, the corporate email system made by Microsoft. Unified Messaging had been invented by Roberta Cohen, Kenneth Huber and Deborah Mill at AT&T Bell Labs. The patent for Unified Messaging was received in June 1989 (Patent number 4,837,798).

Unified Messaging allowed users to access voicemail and email messages using either the graphical user interface (GUI) on their PC, or using the telephone user interface (TUI). Using a PC, users could see voicemails and emails mixed together in their email inbox. Voicemails had a little telephone icon next to them and emails had a little envelope icon next to them (see figure below). For voicemail, they'd see the "header information" (sender, date sent, size, and subject). Users could double-click a voicemail from their email inbox and hear the message through their PC or a phone next to their desk.

Using any phone in the world, users could listen to voice messages like they normally did, plus have emails read to them (in synthesized voice). Voice messages could be sent using email or telephone addressing schemes, and the data networking infrastructure was used to send messages between locations rather than the public switched telephone network. It wasn't until the early 2000s and the availability of reliable, high capacity email servers, high speed internet connections and PCs with speakers or microphones that Unified Messaging achieved commercial success.

Virtual telephony

Other interesting markets developed from the carrier market including a concept called "virtual telephony". Virtual Telephony, developed by Octel, used voicemail to provide phone service rapidly in emerging countries without wiring for telephones. The problem this solved was that emerging countries did not have many telephones. Wiring for telephones was very expensive, and many poorer citizens did not have homes to wire. The economies of emerging countries were held back partly because people could not communicate beyond the area where they could walk or ride a bicycle. Giving them phones was one way to help their economies, but there was not a practical way to do it. In some countries, the wait for a phone was several years and the cost was in the thousands of dollars. Cellular phones were not an option at the time because they were extremely expensive (thousands of dollars per handset) and the infrastructure to install cell sites was also costly.

With virtual telephony, each person could be given a phone number (just the number, not the phone) and a voice mailbox. The citizen would also be given a pager. If someone called the phone number, it never rang on an actual phone, but would be routed immediately to a central voicemail system. The voicemail system answered the call and the caller could leave a long, detailed message. As soon as the message was received, the voicemail system would trigger the citizen's pager. When the page was received, the citizen would find a pay phone and call in to pick up the message. This concept was used successfully in South America and South Africa.

Instant messaging in voice

By the year 2000, voicemail had become a ubiquitous feature on phone systems serving companies, cellular and residential subscribers. Cellular and residential voicemail continue today in their previous form, primarily simple telephone answering. Email became the prevalent messaging system, email servers and software became quite reliable, and virtually all office workers were equipped with multimedia desktop PCs.

The increase in wireless mobility, originally through cellular services and today through IP-based Wi-Fi, was also a driver for messaging convergence with mobile telephony. Today it is not only fostering the use of speech user interfaces for message management, but increasing the demand for retrieval of voice messages integrated with email. It also enables people to reply to both voice and email messages in voice rather than text. New services, such as GotVoice, SpinVox and YouMail, are helping to blur the boundaries between voicemail and text by delivering voicemails to mobile phones as SMS text messages.

Instant messaging in voice: The next development in messaging was in making text messaging real-time, rather than just asynchronous store-and-forward delivery into a mailbox. Although in the 1980s Minitel in France was extremely popular and Teletext was widely used in the US, instant messaging on the Internet began with the ICQ application developed in 1996 as a public Internet-based free text "chat" service for consumers, but soon was being used by business people as well. It introduced the concept of Internet Protocol "presence management" or being able to detect device connectivity to the Internet and contact recipient "availability" status to exchange real-time messages, as well as personalized "Buddy list" directories to allow only people you knew to find out your status and initiate a real-time text messaging exchange with you. Presence and Instant Messaging has since evolved into more than short text messages, but now can include the exchange of data files (documents, pictures) and the escalation of the contact into a voice conversational connection.

Unified messaging with VoIP

Corporate voicemail did not change much until the advent of Voice over IP (VoIP—voice being transmitted over the internet) and the development of Internet Protocol (IP) telephony applications to replace legacy PBX telephony (called TDM technologies). IP telephony changed the style and technology of PBXs and the way voicemail systems integrated with them. This, in turn, facilitated a new generation of Unified Messaging, which is now likely to catch on widely. The flexibility, manageability, lower costs, reliability, speed, and user convenience for messaging convergence is now possible where it wasn't before. This might include intra- and inter-enterprise contacts, mobile contacts, proactive application information delivery, and customer contact applications.

The corporate IP telephony-based voicemail customer premises equipment market is served by several vendors including Avaya, Cisco systems, Adomo, Interactive Intelligence, Nortel, Mitel, 3Com, and AVST. Their marketing strategy will have to address the need to support a variety of legacy PBXs as well as new Voice over IP as enterprises migrate towards converging IP-based telecommunications. A similar situation exists for the carrier market for voicemail servers, currently dominated by Comverse Technology, with some share still held by Lucent Technologies.

VoIP telephony enables centralized, shared servers, with remote administration and usage management for corporate (enterprise) customers. In the past, carriers lost this business because it was far too expensive and inflexible to have remote managed facilities by the phone company. With VoIP, remote administration is far more economical. This technology has re-opened opportunities for carriers to offer hosted, shared services for all forms of converged IP telecommunications, including IP-PBX and voicemail services. Because of the convergence of wired and wireless communications, such services may also include support of a variety of multi-modal handheld and desktop end user devices. This service, when offered for multiple extensions or phone numbers is sometimes also called Unified Voice-mail.

Benefits

Voicemail's introduction enabled people to leave lengthy, secure and detailed messages in natural voice, working hand-in-hand with corporate phone systems. The adoption of voicemail in corporations improved the flow of communications and saved huge amounts of money. GE, one of the pioneer adopters of voicemail in all of its offices around the world, claimed that voicemail saved, on average, over US$1,100 per year per employee. Needless to say, the ability to tell someone something without talking to them, can be a powerful reason to choose voicemail for delivery of a particular message.

Voicemail has two main modes of operation: telephone answering and voice messaging. Telephone answering mode answers outside calls and takes a message from any outside caller (either because the extension was busy or rang no-answer). Voice messaging enables any subscriber (someone with a mailbox number) to send messages directly to any or many subscribers' mailboxes without first calling them. Both of these modes are described below.

How voicemail works

This section describes how the original style, standalone, voicemail system worked with a corporate PBX. The principle is the same with Central Office Switches (CO Switches) or Mobile Telephone Switching Office (MTSOs). More modern voicemail systems work on the same principle, but some of the components may be shared with other systems, such as email systems.

Voicemail systems contain several elements shown in the figure below:
 A central processor (CPU) that runs the operating system and a program (software) that gives the system the look-and-feel of a voicemail system. This software includes thousands of pre-recorded prompts that "speak" to the users as they interact with the system
 Disk controller and multiple disk drives for message storage
 System disks which not only include the software above, but also contain a complete directory of all users with pertinent data about each (name, extension number, voicemail preferences, and pointers to each of the messages stored on the message disk that belong to them)
 Telephone interface system that enables many phone lines to be connected to it

The drawing below shows how the voicemail system interacts with the PBX. Suppose an outside caller is calling Fred's extension 2345. The incoming call comes in from the public network (A) and comes into the PBX. The call is routed to Fred's extension (B), but Fred doesn't answer. After a certain number of rings, the PBX stops ringing Fred's extension and forwards the call to an extension connected to the voicemail system (C). It does this because PBXs are generally programmed to forward busy or unanswered calls to another extension. Simultaneously the PBX tells the voicemail system (through signaling link D) that the call it is forwarding to voicemail is for Fred at extension 2345. In this way, the voicemail system can answer the call with Fred's greeting.

There are many microprocessors throughout the system since the system must handle large amounts of data and it is unacceptable to have any wait times (for example, when the system is recording or playing your message, it is unacceptable if the system stops recording momentarily like computers often do while accessing large files).

When Fred's extension forwards to the voicemail system, the Telephone Interface detects ringing. It signals to the Central Processor (CPU) that a call is coming in. The CPU simultaneously receives a signal on the PBX-Voicemail Data Link (D) telling it that extension 2345 is being forwarded on ring-no-answer to the specific extension that is now ringing. The CPU directs the Telephone Interface (which controls the line interface cards) to answer the call. The CPU's program realizes that it is a call for Fred so it looks up Fred's greeting immediately and directs the Disk Controller to start playing it to the caller. It also plays some system prompts instructing the caller what comes next (for example, "When you have finished recording, you may hang up or press ‘#' for more options"). All "talking" to the caller is done through prompts that are selected by the CPU according to the program stored in the voicemail system. The CPU selects the prompts in response to the keys the caller presses.

The caller's message is digitized by the Telephone Interface system and transmitted to the Disk Controller for storage onto the Message Disks. Some voicemail systems will scramble the message for further security. The CPU then stores the location of that message in the System Disk inside Fred's mailbox directory entry. After the caller hangs up and the message has been stored, the CPU sends a signal to the PBX through the link (D) instructing the PBX to turn on the message waiting light on Fred's phone.

When Fred comes back to his desk and sees the light on his phone, he calls a designated extension number for the voicemail system (an actual extension number assigned to the lines in "C" in the figure above).

Again the Telephone Interface alerts the CPU that a call is coming in on a particular line, but this time the signaling from the PBX-Voicemail Data Link (D) indicates that Fred is calling directly, not being forwarded. The CPU directs the Telephone Interface to answer the call.

Since the CPU "knows" it is Fred (from the signaling on the Data Link D), it looks up Fred's information on the System Disk, specifically his password. The CPU then directs Disk Controller to play a log-on prompt to the user: "Please enter your password." Once the password is entered (via Touch-tones), the CPU compares it to the correct one and, if entered correctly, allows Fred to continue.

The CPU then determines (from Fred's directory entry) that Fred has a new message. The CPU then presents Fred his options (e.g., "You have a new message. To listen to your new message, press 1; to record a message, press 2" etc.) The options are presented by the CPU directing the Disk Controller to play prompts, and the CPU listens for Touch-tones from Fred. This interaction of playing prompts and responding with Touch-tones enables Fred to interact with the voicemail system easily.

If Fred presses 1 to listen to his message, the CPU looks up the location of Fred's new message in his mailbox directory (on the System Disk), and directs the Disk Controller to play that message. The Disk Controller finds the message on the Message Disks, and sends the data stream directly to the Telephone Interface. The Telephone Interface then converts the data stream to sound and plays it to Fred through the Line Interface Card which Fred is connected to.

Playback controls (like rewind, pause, fast forward, changing volume, etc.) are all input via Touch-tones, are "read" by the CPU, and the appropriate actions are taken based on the stored program in the system. For example, if Fred wants to pause message playback, he might press 2. Since the CPU is constantly listening for Touch-tones from Fred, his command causes the CPU to direct the Disk Controller to stop playing the message. A variety of playback controls and options are available on most sophisticated voicemail systems so that users can control message playback, store messages in archives, send messages to groups, change their preferences, etc.

The better designed voicemail systems have a user-friendly interface with clear and meaningful prompts so the interaction with the voicemail system is quick and easy.

See also

 CDMA
 IP telephony
 Visual voicemail

References

Further reading 

 "A Reactive Telephone Message Network for the Office of the Future", Business Communications Review, July-Aug 1980; "Voice Mail Arrives in the Office", Business Week, June 9, 1980, p. 81.
 "The Case for Voice Mail: Confirmed." GE Corporate Telecommunications publication, May 1989, Constance C. Kelly, editor.
 "IBM Audio Distribution System", IBM publication GX60-0075-0
 "Toward Competitive Provision of Public Record Message Services", Experimental Technology Incentives Program, National Bureau of Standards, Washington, DC. Publication NBX-GCR-ETIP-81-97 October, 1991.
 "Speech Filing System Reference Manual", 1975, by J. W. Schoonard and S. J. Boies, IBM Research Center, Yorktown Heights, NY, 10598.
 "How to Shoulder Aside the Titans", Gene Bylinsky, Fortune, May 18, 1992; "Octel Keeps Bringing You Voice Mail", Global Telecoms Business (UK), February/March 1996, pp. 22–24
 "Human Factors Challenges In Creating A Principal Support Office System: The Speech Filing System Approach", by John D. Gould and Stephen J. Boies, IBM Tomas J. Watson Research Center, as quoted in a paper presented to the Association for Computer Machinery. See ACM Transactions on Office Information Systems, Vol. 1, No. 4, October 1983, pp. 273–298.
 "IBM Audio Distribution System Subscriber's Guide" and "IBM Audio Distribution System, Administrator's Guide". IBM Publications SC34-0400-3 and SC34-0400-1
 Correspondence with Jay Stoffer, March 26, 2006: " ... As to Gordon Matthews, I was introduced to him by a Venture Capitalist that later invested in Delphi. I met with Gordon and his wife at their home in Dallas with the objective of ascertaining if he could contribute to our product planning process. I concluded that he would not be likely to add value in that activity but that my colleagues should evaluate his potential contribution to Engineering. To that end, we flew Gordon back to LA where he was interviewed by members of our technical team. It was at this time (1973/1974) that he would have seen a demonstration of the voice application. He had definitely been thinking about a voice-mail system prior to this visit but he had definitely not established his company or raised the capital to do so. Furthermore, his product plan was still very much in the formative stage and never reached the sophistication of the Delphi offering." Needless to say, there was no employment offer made to Matthews by Delphi.
 Transcriptions of various seminars sponsored by Probe Research, Inc., September 1982:
 "Voice Message Service," Proceedings of Voice Processing Seminar, September 15, 1982;
 "BBL Industries, Inc.," Proceedings of Voice Processing Seminar, September 15, 1982;
 "Wang Laboratories," Proceedings of Voice Processing Seminar, September 16, 1982;
 "American Telephone and Telegraph, Inc.," Proceedings of Voice Processing Seminar, September 16, 1982;
 "Commterm, Inc.," Proceedings of Voice Processing Seminar, September 16, 1982.
 "Voice Store and Forward for the Automated Office", a presentation by Lawrence E. Bergeron, Dennis B. Howell and Dean Osborne, Wang Laboratories, Inc., Lowell, Mass., transcribed in "Computer Controlled Voice Message Systems and the Office of the Future", Professional Program Session Record (10), Wescon/81, Electronic Show and Convention, September 15–17 September 1981, section 2, pp. 1–8.
 "The PhoneMail System for the ROLM CBX", publication by ROLM Corporation.
 "Octel Emerges as Rising Star in Voice Messaging Systems", Peninsula Times Tribune, November 7, 1988, page C-1; "Investors Waking Up to Octel's Leadership", Investor's Daily, February 17, 1989; "Octel's Stock Gamble Has Paid Off", USA Today, February 24, 1989, page 3B.
 "Octel Communications Corporation", filings with the Securities and Exchange Commission for its prospectus for secondary public offering, August 15, 1989; Various internal manuals and publications from Octel Communications Corporation.
 "All Your Messages in One Place", Michael H. Martin, Fortune, May 12, 1997, p. 172.
 "Toward Competitive Provision of Public Record Message Services", ETIP (Experimental Technology Incentives Program), National Bureau of Standards, Washington, DC, October, 1981; "domestic Public Message Services", FCC publication 71FCC 2d 471; "Telecommunications Competition and Deregulation Act of 1981" (FCC Computer Inquiry II), Docket 20828, December 30, 1980; "Denial of AT&T Petition for Waiver of Section 64.702 of the Commission Rules and Regulations", October 7, 1981, Federal Communications Reports 88FCC 2d.
 United States of America (Plaintiff) v. Western Electric Company, Inc., et al. (Defendants). Civil action no. 82–0192, Section VII pp. 51–65: "The judge on review considers the threat to possible competition in the voice-mail and storage business to be less real than the opportunities lost to the public welfare by these services not being broadly available. Hence, the BOCs should be able to provide voice-mail."
 AT&T Wireless ultimately bought McCaw Cellular. The combined company was eventually bought by Cingular.
 GSM (Global System for Mobile Carriers) is one of the various cellular technologies which include TDMA, CDMA, iDEN and others. GSM is currently the technology used by Cingular in the US and is the prevalent technology in over 100 countries around the world.
 Investor's Business Daily, February 1, 1996. "Octel's Robert Cohn: CEO of Voice-Messaging Firm Puts Premium on Speed", by Kathleen Doler.
 "Lucent Is Set to Buy Leader in Voice Mail", Seth Schiesel, The New York Times, July 18, 1997, Page C1.

American inventions
Calling features
Computer-mediated communication
Voice over IP

de:Anrufbeantworter
he:מענה קולי
ja:留守番電話